Hutz may refer to:

Eugene Hütz (born 1972), a Ukrainian-American musician
Lionel Hutz, a fictional lawyer from The Simpsons
Sarah Hutz (born 1979), an American politician